Venango Catholic High School is a private, Roman Catholic high school in Oil City, Pennsylvania.  It is located in the Roman Catholic Diocese of Erie.

Notes and references

External links
  School Website

Catholic secondary schools in Pennsylvania
Schools in Venango County, Pennsylvania
Oil City, Pennsylvania